Mikhail Mitsev (born 6 December 1940) is a Bulgarian boxer. He competed in the men's bantamweight event at the 1964 Summer Olympics. At the 1964 Summer Olympics, he lost to Franco Zurlo of Italy.

References

1940 births
Living people
Bulgarian male boxers
Olympic boxers of Bulgaria
Boxers at the 1964 Summer Olympics
Place of birth missing (living people)
Bantamweight boxers